Luke Adamson (born 17 November 1987) is an English rugby league footballer who plays as a  or  for the Leigh Centurions in the Betfred Championship.

He previously played club level rugby union (RU) for Bath Rugby, and also rugby league (RL) Leigh East ARLFC, the Salford City Reds in the Super League and Halifax, the Dewsbury Rams and Oldham (Heritage № 1374) in the Championship.

Background
Adamson was born Lowton, Greater Manchester, England.

Career
Adamson attended St Ambrose College in Hale Barns where he made his mark in rugby union as a strong running centre. He also represented Cheshire (RU), but his rugby league apprenticeship was served with the famous Leigh East amateur club where he spent three years. He made his début for the Salford City Reds versus Wakefield Trinity Wildcats in 2006. He is also an England academy player, representing England against Australia.

At the end of the 2012 Super League season, Adamson left the Salford City Reds due to the club's financial troubles, and returned to rugby union when he signed for Bath Rugby.

In 2017, Adamson was signed by Oldham.

Personal life
His younger brother Toby Adamson has also played for Dewsbury Rams, and Rochdale Hornet.

References

External links
Rochdale Hornets profile
(archived by web.archive.org) Profile at reds.co.uk

1987 births
Living people
Bath Rugby players
Dewsbury Rams players
English rugby league players
English rugby union players
Halifax R.L.F.C. players
Leigh Leopards players
Oldham R.L.F.C. players
People educated at St. Ambrose College
People from Lowton
Rochdale Hornets players
Rugby league locks
Rugby league players from Wigan
Rugby league props
Rugby league second-rows
Rugby union centres
Rugby union players from Wigan
Salford Red Devils players